The Battle of Los Corrales took place in Parque Patricios, Buenos Aires, Argentina, on June 21, 1880, and confronted the side led by Carlos Tejedor, governor of Buenos Aires, against the National Army led by president Nicolás Avellaneda.

Battles involving Argentina
June 1880 events
1880 in Argentina
Conflicts in 1880